Holy Name of Jesus Parish is a Roman Catholic parish in Stratford, Connecticut, part of the  Diocese of Bridgeport.

History 
The original church now serves as the church hall. The gothic revival church was built to the designs of the highly regarded local church architect Andrew G. Patrick and completed in 1957.

In 1993, a suit was filed against the Diocese by two people claiming they were sexually abused by Reverend Raymond Pcolka. This suit was later joined by eleven more people and led to Pcolka's being defrocked.

Culture
Holy Name hosted the 99th anniversary meeting of Slovensky Katolícky Sokol Group 2, or The Slovak Alliance of Greater Bridgeport, a local chapter of a national Slovak cultural society, and it is the location of monthly meetings of that chapter.

References

External links 
 Diocese of Bridgeport
 Official website: Holy Name of Jesus Church, Stratford, Connecticut

Roman Catholic churches in Connecticut
Gothic Revival church buildings in Connecticut
Buildings and structures in Stratford, Connecticut
Roman Catholic Diocese of Bridgeport
Churches in Fairfield County, Connecticut